An out-of-the-box feature or functionality (also called OOTB or off the shelf), particularly in software, is a native feature or built-in functionality of a product that comes directly from the vendor and works immediately when the product is placed in service. In the context of software, out-of-the-box features and functionality are available for all users by default and do not require customization, modification, configuration, scripting, add-ons, modules, third-party tools, or additional fees in order to be used.

See also
 Convention over configuration
 Commercial off-the-shelf
 Government off-the-shelf
 Commodity computing
 Out-of-box experience

References

Software features